Apatema fasciata is a moth of the family Autostichidae. It is found on the Canary Islands and Madeira.

The wings have a dark ground colour.

References

Moths described in 1859
Apatema
Moths of Africa